Francisco "Fran" José García Torres (born 14 August 1999) is a Spanish professional footballer who plays as a left back for La Liga club Rayo Vallecano.

Club career

Real Madrid 
Born in Bolaños de Calatrava, Ciudad Real, Castilla–La Mancha, García joined Real Madrid's La Fábrica in 2009, from hometown side Bolaños CF. On 1 February 2018, while still a junior, he renewed his contract until 2022.

Promoted to the reserves ahead of the 2018–19 season, García made his senior debut on 9 September by playing the last 25 minutes of a 0–0 Segunda División B away draw against AD Unión Adarve. He made his first team debut on 6 December, coming on as a second-half substitute for Dani Carvajal in a 6–1 home routing of UD Melilla, for the season's Copa del Rey.

García scored his first senior goal on 15 December 2019, netting his team's second in a 3–0 home win against Getafe CF B.

Rayo Vallecano 
The following 1 September 2020, García was loaned to Segunda División club Rayo Vallecano for the 2020–21 campaign. He made his professional debut on 13 September 2020, starting in a 1–0 away win against RCD Mallorca. García immediately became a starter for Andoni Iraola's side, but suffered a knee injury in November; initially expected to miss the remainder of the campaign, he returned to play after 20 days.

On 13 July 2021, after helping in Rayo's promotion to La Liga, García joined the club permanently on a four-year contract. He made his debut in the category on 15 August, starting in a 3–0 away loss to Sevilla FC. Considering his applaudable performance during 2022–23 season, multiple clubs have noticed his outstanding improvement, including his boyhood club Real Madrid.

Career statistics

Club

References

External links
Real Madrid profile

1999 births
Living people
People from Ciudad Real
Sportspeople from the Province of Ciudad Real
Spanish footballers
Footballers from Castilla–La Mancha
Association football defenders
Spain youth international footballers
Spain under-21 international footballers
La Liga players
Segunda División players
Segunda División B players
Real Madrid Castilla footballers
Real Madrid CF players
Rayo Vallecano players